Stanley Lee Von Nieda Jr. (born June 19, 1922) is an American retired professional basketball player and coach. He was born in Ephrata, Pennsylvania.

Career
He played basketball at Ephrata High School and Penn State University.  Enlisting in the army during World War II, he played with the Fort Benning, Georgia paratroopers.  There he led the country, both college and service teams, in scoring with 1062 points in 44 games.  After being discharged he played for the Lancaster Red Roses in the Eastern Basketball League where he led that league in scoring, averaging better than 24 points per game.

In 1947 he began playing for the Tri-Cities BlackHawks in the National Basketball League (NBL). While with the Blackhawks he made the All-Rookie team averaging 12 points a game. The team made it to the final round of the playoffs in both of the years he played there.  In 1949, the founding year of the National Basketball Association (NBA), he was traded to the Baltimore Bullets where he completed the 1949 and 1950 NBA seasons.  In  Baltimore he started every game playing both point guard and shooting guard.  Whitey was known for his quickness on the court.

After leaving the NBA he coached at Elizabethtown College for two years.  In 1952 he became the player/coach of the Lancaster Red Roses for four years making it to the finals three of the four years. Von Nieda was selected to the All-EPBL Second Team in 1951. Again in 1985 he coached Lancaster in the Continental League, these teams were a stepping stone to the NBA.  Once again his team made it to the finals.  For many years he coached junior teams where he worked with 10- and 12-year-old kids teaching them the fundamentals of basketball.

Personal life
Von Nieda resides in Elizabethtown, Pennsylvania, with his wife, Arlene. He turned 100 on June 19, 2022; he is the first NBA player to reach 100 years of age. He is currently the oldest living former NBA player.

NBA career statistics

Regular season

References

External links

1922 births
Living people
American men's basketball players
Baltimore Bullets (1944–1954) players
Basketball coaches from Pennsylvania
Basketball players from Pennsylvania
Point guards
People from Ephrata, Pennsylvania
Penn State Nittany Lions basketball players
Shooting guards
Tri-Cities Blackhawks players
United States Army personnel of World War II
American centenarians
Men centenarians